Erythrophleum chlorostachys, commonly known as Cooktown ironwood, is a species of leguminous tree endemic to northern Australia.

Description
The Cooktown ironwood is semi-deciduous, dropping much of its foliage in response to the prolonged winter dry periods which are the norm within its native range. The foliage of the tree contains toxic levels of alkaloids and has been responsible for numerous deaths of both cattle and horses. The species is a beautiful source of timber, which is exceptionally hard and dense as well as being highly termite resistant. The eastern dragon shaped heartwood skeletons of the tree resist natural degradation and add wonder to the landscape.

Distribution and habitat
The species occurs from north-eastern Queensland to the Kimberley region of Western Australia.  It is found in a wide range of environments, from arid savanna to tropical rainforest.

Usage
Virtually all culturally modified trees in Eucalyptus tetrodonta woodland on Cape York Peninsula are Cooktown ironwoods. Most of these are 'sugar bag scars' where Aboriginal people have cut through the cambium into the heartwood of the tree to remove honey from native bees. Scars have been made using both stone axes (in pre-contact times) and steel axes (post-contact). These have particular significance to Aboriginal people as the tangible representation of past cultural practices. The large number of hollows found in Cooktown ironwoods at Kakadu National Park are also likely to be culturally modified trees (e.g. Taylor 2002 Figure 6.8).

References

Boland, D.J., Brooker M.I.H, Chippendale, G.M., Hall, N., Hyland, B.P.M., Johnstone, R.D., Kleinig, D.A., Turner, J.D. (1984). "Forest trees of Australia." CSIRO. Melbourne.
Dunlop, C.R., Leach, G.J. and Cowie, I.D. (1995). "Flora of the Darwin region. 2." Conservation Commission of the Northern Territory. Darwin.
Morrison, M., McNaughton, D. and Shiner, J. (2010). "Mission-Based Indigenous Production at the Weipa Presbyterian Mission, Western Cape York Peninsula (1932-66)". International Journal of Historical Archaeology 14:86-111.
Taylor, R. (2002). "Ironwood Erythrophleum chlorostachys in the Northern Territory: aspects of its ecology in relation to timber harvesting". Report to Agriculture, Fisheries and Forestry, Australia.

chlorostachys
Fabales of Australia
Flora of Queensland
Flora of the Northern Territory
Rosids of Western Australia
Trees of Australia
Drought-tolerant trees
Taxa named by Ferdinand von Mueller